Aponoea obtusipalpis is a moth of the family Gelechiidae. It is found in Spain, Libya and Algeria.

The wingspan is 16–21 mm. The forewings are cinereous, dusted with black scales. The hindwings are rosy grey.

The larvae probably feed on Limoniastrum guyonianum.

References

Moths described in 1905
Chelariini
Moths of Europe
Moths of Africa